Oblivion is the third album by London indie pop band Biff Bang Pow! released in 1987.<ref name="Discogs.com">[http://www.discogs.com/Biff-Bang-Pow-Oblivion/release/1014228 Biff Bang Pow! on Discogs.com]</ref>

Track listing
Side AIn A Mourning Town - (02:40)There You Go Again - (02:04)7 Seconds - (02:51)A Girl Called Destruction - (03:12)She's Got Diamonds In Her Hair - (03:28)
Side BThe Only Color In This World Is Love - (02:51)Baby Sister - (02:52)Then When I Scream - (03:19)I See The Sun - (02:52)I'm Still Waiting For My Time'' - (03:54)

Personnel
Dave Evans - bass
Ken Popple - drums
Richard Green - guitar
Andrew Innes - organ, guitar
Alan McGee - vocals, guitar

References

1987 albums
Biff Bang Pow! albums